Delwayne Delaney (born 4 August 1982) is a Saint Kitts and Nevis sprinter who specializes in the 100 metres.

Individually, he competed at the 2004 World Indoor Championships without progressing from the first round. With the Saint Kitts and Nevis 4 x 100 metres relay team he finished fifth at the 2003 Central American and Caribbean Championships.

His personal best times are 10.31 seconds in the 100 metres and 20.83 seconds in the 200 metres, both achieved in July 2007 in San Salvador.

Achievements

References

1982 births
Living people
People from Basseterre
Saint Kitts and Nevis male sprinters
Pan American Games silver medalists for Saint Kitts and Nevis
Pan American Games medalists in athletics (track and field)
Athletes (track and field) at the 2003 Pan American Games
Athletes (track and field) at the 2011 Pan American Games
Athletes (track and field) at the 2015 Pan American Games
Commonwealth Games competitors for Saint Kitts and Nevis
Athletes (track and field) at the 2014 Commonwealth Games
Medalists at the 2011 Pan American Games